James Thomson (c.1797 – 23 March 1859) was a pastoralist  and politician in colonial Victoria, a member of the Victorian Legislative Council.

Early life
Thomson was born in Edinburgh, Scotland, the son of John Thomson, a watchmaker, and Anne, née Young.

Colonial Australia
Thomson arrived in Hobart in January 1823 and the Port Phillip District around 1840. On 14 June 1853 Thomson was elected to the unicameral Victorian Legislative Council for Ripon, Hampden, Grenville and Polwarth. Thomson held this position until resigning in February 1854.

Thomson died near Port Fairy, Victoria on 23 March 1859, he had married Elizabeth Glen Boynton in 1856.

References

 

1797 births
1859 deaths
Members of the Victorian Legislative Council
Politicians from Edinburgh
Australian pastoralists
19th-century Australian politicians
Scottish emigrants to Australia
19th-century Australian businesspeople